Baldev Singh Aulakh (born 10 June 1964) is an Indian politician from the state of Uttar Pradesh. He currently represents the Bilaspur constituency in the Uttar Pradesh Legislative Assembly as a Leader of the Bharatiya Janata Party.

Political career 
Aulakh participated in youth politics while studying in Kumaun University. In 1998, he joined the Bharatiya Janata Party after meeting Mukhtar Abbas Naqvi. He won from the Bilaspur constituency in the 2017 Assembly election by defeating Indian National Congress' Sanjay Kapoor.

Posts held

References 

Living people
1964 births
Uttar Pradesh MLAs 2017–2022
Bharatiya Janata Party politicians from Uttar Pradesh
Uttar Pradesh MLAs 2022–2027